Kleenheat is an Australian gas producer, retailer and distributor based in Perth, Western Australia.

Kleenheat produces around 150,000 tonnes of liquefied petroleum gas (LPG) per year to service more than 240,000 customers nationally. The company also supplies liquefied natural gas (LNG) to the heavy-vehicle, power generation and industrial markets nationally through EVOL LNG.

History
Kleenheat Gas was established by Wesfarmers in 1956 under the leadership of then General Manager John Thomson, who raised the prospect of selling bottled gas with BP during a visit to London. He returned with an exclusive franchise agreement to supply LPG from BP's then-new Kwinana Oil Refinery.

In September 1956, Kleenheat Gas became the first company to distribute bottled LPG and gas appliances to regional Western Australia. Demand for the convenience of gas was so great that 1500 appliances were sold before the first gas bottles were available.

In 2013, Kleenheat Gas launched a natural gas retailing business, introducing retail competition in Western Australia for residential and small business customers from Geraldton to Busselton for the first time. Previously, the market had operated under a monopoly by American-owned Alinta Energy.

In April 2014, Kleenheat Gas reviewed its LPG operations and agreed to sell its LPG distribution business in Victoria, South Australia, Queensland, New South Wales, the Australian Capital Territory and Tasmania to Elgas Limited. The sale was completed in December 2014.

Products
Liquefied petroleum gas (LPG) – Kleenheat Gas supplies LPG to more than 230,000 residential customers and 14,000 businesses across all mainland Australian states. LPG is distributed in bottled form through a network of depots, company operated branches, commission agents and dealers across Western Australia and Northern Territory . Kleenheat supplies LPG for leisure appliances under the Kwik-Gas brand and for motor vehicles under the AutoGas brand.
Natural gas – Kleenheat supplies natural gas to around 150,000 customers in households and small businesses from Busselton to Geraldton.
Liquefied natural gas (LNG) – Kleenheat Gas' subsidiary EVOL LNG supplies LNG for heavy-duty vehicles, remote power generation and industrial plants. Kleenheat Gas was the first company in Australia to introduce LNG into the heavy-duty vehicle market with the construction of a 4 tpd micro LNG plant in Kwinana in 2004. Today the company supplies LNG to the heavy duty vehicle market through a network of LNG truck fuelling stations located in Perth, Kalgoorlie, Geraldton, Mount Magnet and Newman in Western Australia, as well as Deer Park and Wodonga in Victoria.

References

External links
 

Natural gas companies of Australia
Wesfarmers